Moenui is a small settlement 3 km east of Havelock in the South Island of New Zealand. It is situated on the shores of the Mahikipawa arm of the Mahau Sound - one of the many sounds in the Marlborough Sounds. The meaning of Moenui is "Big Sleep".

References

Populated places in the Marlborough Region
Populated places in the Marlborough Sounds